This is a list of released video games for the Wii which allow use of the Wii Remote expansion Classic Controller/Classic Controller Pro and/or GameCube controller (215 games). This list does not include games released on Nintendo's Virtual Console as the Classic Controller and GameCube controller can also be used for all Virtual Console games, with the exception of some TurboGrafx-16 games. Many of the games on this list are ports, remakes or sequels of prior generation games, especially ones released for the GameCube itself, or games that were concurrently released on or ported to Sony (PlayStation) and Microsoft (Xbox) consoles, whose primary controllers are typical modern twin-stick gamepads.  Some Wii games on this list support traditional controls because they do not utilize the system's signature motion controls at all.

While all Wii models and the Wii U support the Classic Controller, only the original model released in 2006 (RVL-001) supports the GameCube controller because it contains four built-in GameCube controller ports as part of its backwards compatibility with GameCube games and accessories, a feature that was dropped from future models such the Wii Family Edition and the Wii Mini.  The Wii U generally does not support the GameCube controller, with only one game, Super Smash Bros. for Wii U, allowing it to be used as a valid control setup via a special external USB peripheral that provides four ports for the said controller.  No other Wii U software, including previously released Wii and Virtual Console titles playable on that system that support such controller, are allowed to utilize that peripheral.

The emulator Dolphin does not require Wii input devices including the Classic Controller. For example, New Super Mario Bros. Wii does not support the Classic Controller for the Wii hardware console, but the game can be played with any gamepad from Dolphin.

List

WiiWare
WiiWare (discontinued) games

if WiiWare pressed ≠ open

See also
 List of Wii games
 List of WiiWare games
 List of GameCube games

References

Wii games with traditional control schemes
Wii
Wii